This is a list of political parties in Greenland, as of 20 April 2021. Greenland has a multi-party system.

Active parties

Dissolved parties
 Sukaq
 Labour Party
 Women's Party
 Polar Party
 Centre Party (Greenland)
 Roots Party
 Association of Candidates
 People's Party

References

Greenland
 
Political parties in Greenland
Greenland
Political parties